Lembah Subang LRT station is a Light Rapid Transit (LRT) station at Ara Damansara, in Petaling Jaya, Selangor. This station is located near the Lembah Subang Depot.

It is operated under the Kelana Jaya LRT system network as found in the station signage. Like most other LRT stations operating in Klang Valley, this station is elevated.

The station is in the vicinity of the NZX commercial centre, EVE Suites, and the neighbourhoods of Ara Damansara and Taman Megah Mas.

Services and connections

Services
In 2019, peak-hour frequency between Ara Damansara and Gombak were increased. Waiting times were tentatively reduced by half from every 3 minutes to every 1.5 minutes to cater to increasing demand. Frequency went back to be consistent on the entire line when the pandemic began.

Feeder bus services
The Lembah Subang LRT station is served by feeder buses operated for both the LRT Kelana Jaya as well as the MRT Sungai Buloh-Kajang Line.

Yard
Lembah Subang station is also adjacent to the Subang Depot, the only yard serving the Kelana Jaya Line.

Notes and references

Notes

References

External links 
Lembah Subang LRT station

Kelana Jaya Line
Railway stations opened in 2016